The  San Jose SaberCats season was the 17th season for the franchise Arena Football League (AFL). The team was coached by Darren Arbet and played their home games at the SAP Center at San Jose. The SaberCats qualified for the playoffs with a 13–5 record, but were eliminated by the top seeded Arizona Rattlers in the conference semifinals by a 59–49 score.

Final roster

Standings

Schedule

Regular season
The SaberCats began the season by visiting the San Antonio Talons on March 23. Their first home game was against the Orlando Predators on March 29. They closed the regular season at home against the Chicago Rush on July 27.

Playoffs

References

San Jose SaberCats
San Jose SaberCats seasons
San